Labastide-Savès is a commune in the Gers department in the Occitania region in Southwestern France. In 2019, it had a population of 179.

Geography

Demographics

See also
Communes of the Gers department

References

Communes of Gers